Bethesda Church may refer to:

Churches 
 Bethesda-by-the-Sea, Palm Beach, Florida
 Bethesda Meeting House, Bethesda, Maryland
 Bethesda Baptist Church and Cemetery, Greene County, Georgia
 Bethesda Episcopal Church (Saratoga Springs), New York
 Bethesda Methodist Protestant Church, Brinkleyville, North Carolina

Other uses 
 Battle of Bethesda Church, during the American Civil War

See also 
 Bethesda Chapel (disambiguation)
 Bethesda Presbyterian Church (disambiguation)